Tragic Love is a 1909 American silent short drama film directed by D. W. Griffith.

Cast
 Arthur V. Johnson as Bob Spaulding
 David Miles as Mr. Rankin
 Linda Arvidson as Mrs. Rankin
 Charles Avery as In Factory
 Clara T. Bracy
 John R. Cumpson as Bartender
 George Gebhardt as First Thief / In Factory
 Robert Harron as Paper Boy
 Raymond Hatton as A Detective / In Factory (unconfirmed)
 Anita Hendrie as The Landlady / The Thieves' Accomplice / In Factory
 Charles Inslee as Second Thief
 Florence Lawrence as The Maid / In Factory
 Marion Leonard as In Factory
 Jeanie MacPherson
 Herbert Miles
 Mack Sennett as Bartender / Policeman / In Factory
 Harry Solter as In Factory

References

External links
 

1909 films
1909 drama films
1909 short films
Silent American drama films
American silent short films
American black-and-white films
Films directed by D. W. Griffith
1900s American films